Imam Lyes Stadium, is a multi-use stadium in Médéa, Algeria.  It is currently used mostly for football matches and is the home ground of Olympique de Médéa.  The stadium holds 12,000 spectators.

References

External links
Stadium Information
dzfoot club profile

Imam
Buildings and structures in Médéa Province